The Central Bank of Luxembourg (BCL) was founded in 1998, at the same time the European Central Bank was created, by laws dated 22 April and 23 December. It is part of the European System of Central Banks (ESCB) and the Eurosystem.

The Banque centrale du Luxembourg's head office is located on Boulevard Royal.

Governors
Pierre Jaans (Director General of IML 1983–1998)
Raymond Kirsch (President of IML 1985–1998)
Yves Mersch (1998–2013)
Gaston Reinesch (since 2013)

See also
List of banks in Luxembourg
Economy of Luxembourg
:Euro
Luxembourgish franc

References

 Ernest Mühlen, Monnaie et circuits financiers au Grand-Duché de Luxembourg, Université Internationale de Sciences Comparées, Luxembourg, 1968.
 Roger Croisé, René Link, La législation monétaire au Grand-Duché de Luxembourg de 1815 à nos jours, Edition Lux-Numis, Luxembourg,1988, 639 p.

External links
 Official site of Banque centrale du Luxembourg
European Central Bank

Banks of Luxembourg
Luxembourg
Luxembourg
Government-owned companies of Luxembourg
Companies based in Luxembourg City
Banks established in 1998
Government agencies of Luxembourg
Luxembourgian companies established in 1998